Marian Rułka (22 July 1929, Lublin – 13 November 1983, Warsaw) was a Polish theatre and film actor. In 1952 he graduated from The Aleksander Zelwerowicz National Academy of Dramatic Art in Warsaw. He has worked in the Ateneum Theatre, the Juliusz Osterwa Theatre in Lublin, the Wola Theatre in Warsaw, and National Theatre in Warsaw.

External links
http://www.imdb.com/name/nm0750040/

1929 births
1983 deaths
Actors from Lublin
Polish male actors